State Road 450 is a winding route in southern Indiana that terminates at both ends at its parent route, U.S. Route 50.

Route description
State Road 450 begins just north of the town of Shoals in Martin County and runs northeast to rejoin U.S. Route 50 in Bedford in Lawrence County.

Major intersections

References

450
Transportation in Martin County, Indiana
Transportation in Lawrence County, Indiana